Merak Film S.r.l. was an Italian dubbing studio based in Cologno Monzese, Milan. Founded in 1980 and closed in 2020, the studio commissioned Italian language dubbed versions of numerous anime, cartoons, movies, sitcoms, and other content for its clients. Numerous voice artists worked at the studio.

Partners
 Cartoon Network (Italy)
 Warner Bros.
 Nickelodeon (Italy)
 Mediaset
 RAI

Content

 One Piece
 Detective Conan
 Berserk
 Pokémon
 iCarly
 Hamtaro
 Beyblade
 SpongeBob SquarePants
 Ojarumaru
 Fancy Lala
 Yu-Gi-Oh! GX
 Johnny Test
 Ozzy & Drix
 Bubble Guppies
 Trauma Center
 Invader Zim
 Pokémon: The First Movie
 Pokémon: The Movie 2000
 Pokémon 3: The Movie
 The Batman
 Justice League
 Justice League Unlimited
 Dexter's Laboratory
 Stoked
 Casper's Scare School
 Angel's Friends
 Sgt. Frog
 The Sweeney
 Love, Inc.
 Automan
 Tenspeed and Brown Shoe
 Manimal
 Tokyo Mew Mew
 Yu-Gi-Oh! Duel Monsters
 Yu-Gi-Oh! 5D's
 Power Rangers Lost Galaxy
 The Mystic Knights of Tir Na Nog
 Barney & Friends
 Batman: The Brave and the Bold
 Normal, Ohio
 Totally Spies!
 Ai Shite Knight
 The Oblongs
 The World of Peter Rabbit and Friends
 Sabrina: The Animated Series
 Odd Job Jack
 Care Bears: Adventures in Care-a-lot
 Puppy in My Pocket: Adventures in Pocketville
 Underdog (TV series)
 RoboDz Kazagumo Hen
 Stitch!
 W.I.T.C.H
 Big Barn Farm
 The Cat in the Hat Knows a Lot About That!
 Almost Naked Animals
 Shaman King
 Flint the Time Detective
 Bad Dog
 Spider-Man Unlimited
 The Tick
 Gadget and the Gadgetinis
 The Why Why Family
 Eek! The Cat
 Bubble Guppies
 Olivia
 The Busy World of Richard Scarry (second dub)
 Busytown Mysteries
 The Adventures of Jimmy Neutron: Boy Genius
 El Tigre: The Adventures of Manny Rivera
 Angelina Ballerina: The Next Steps
 Tottoko Hamutaro Hai!
 Dragon Ball (second dub)
 Dragon Ball Z
 Dragon Ball GT
 My Little Pony: Friendship Is Magic
 Yu-Gi-Oh! Zexal
 and more

Voice artists

 Alberto Sette
 Aldo Stella
 Alessandro D'Errico
 Alessandra Karpoff
 Alessandro Rigotti
 Alessandro Zurla
 Andrea De Nisco
 Angiolina Gobbi
 Annalisa Longo 
 Antonello Governale
 Antonio Paiola
 Augusto Di Bono
 Beatrice Caggiula
 Benedetta Ponticelli
 Caterina Rochira
 Cinzia Massironi
 Claudio Moneta
 Claudio Ridolfo
 Cristina Giolitti
 Cristina Rossi
 Dania Cericola
 Daniela Fava
 Daniela Trapelli
 Daniele Demma
 Dario Oppido
 Davide Albano
 Davide Garbolino
 Debora Magnaghi
 Deborah Morese
 Diego Sabre
 Donatella Fanfani
 Elda Olivieri
 Elisabetta Cesone
 Elisabetta Spinelli
 Emanuela Pacotto
 Enrico Bertorelli
 Fabrizio Valezano
 Federica Valenti
 Federico Danti
 Federico Zanandrea
 Felice Invernici
 Flavio Arras
 Francesca Bielli
 Francesco Falco
 Francesco Orlando
 Gabriele Calindri
 Gea Riva
 Gianni Gaude
 Gianni Quillico
 Gianluca Iacono
 Gianfranco Gamba
 Giorgio Bonino
 Giuliana Atepi
 Giuliana Nanni
 Giulia Franzoso
 Giuseppe Calvetti
 Giovanni Battezzato
 Giovanna Papandrea
 Graziella Porta
 Graziano Galoforo
 Irene Scalzo
 Ivo De Palma
 Jasmine Laurenti
 Jenny De Cesarei
 Jolanda Granato
 Lara Parmiani
 Laura Brambilla
 Leonardo Graziano
 Loredana Foresta
 Loredana Nicosia
 Lorenzo Scattorin
 Loretta Di Pisa
 Luca Bottale
 Luca Ghignone
 Luca Sandri
 Luca Semeraro
 Luigi Rosa
 Maddalena Vadacca
 Marcella Silvestri
 Marco Balbi
 Marco Balzarotti
 Marco Pagani
 Marina Thovez
 Marinella Armagni
 Mario Scarabelli
 Mario Zucca
 Martino Consoli
 Massimo Di Benedetto
 Matteo Zanotti
 Maurizio Merluzzo
 Maurizio Trombini
 Monica Bonetto
 Natale Ciravolo
 Nicola Bartolini Carrassi
 Oliviero Corbetta
 Orlando Mezzabotta
 Paola Della Pasqua
 Paolo De Santis
 Paolo Sesana
 Paolo Torrisi
 Patrizio Prata
 Patrizia Mottola
 Patrizia Salmoiraghi
 Patrizia Scianca
 Pietro Ubaldi
 Pino Pirovano
 Raffaele Farina
 Renata Bertolas
 Renato Novara
 Riccardo Peroni
 Riccardo Rovatti
 Rosa Leo Servidio
 Rossana Bassani
 Ruggero Andreozzi
 Sabrina Bonfitto
 Serena Clerici
 Simone D'Andrea
 Simone Lupinacci
 Sonia Mazza
 Stefania Patruno
 Stefano Albertini
 Stefano Pozzi
 Tony Fuochi
 Tosawi Piovani
 Tullia Piredda
 Valentina Pallavicino
 Valeria Falcinelli

See also
 Studio P.V.
 Deneb Film
 Dubbing Brothers International Italia
 Cine Video Doppiatori
 Pumaisdue
 Sefit - CDC
 C.D. Cine Dubbing
 Studio Asci (Italy)
 LaBibi.it
 Logos srl
 Raflesia Srl
 ADC Group

References

External links 
 

Italian dubbing studios
Mass media companies established in 1980
Mass media companies of Italy
Companies based in Milan
Mass media in Milan